Sergei Mikhailovich Zhdanov (born 21 January 1973) is a former Russian football player.

References

1973 births
Living people
Soviet footballers
Russian footballers
FC Fakel Voronezh players
Russian Premier League players
FC Tekstilshchik Kamyshin players
TSG Neustrelitz players
Russian expatriate footballers
Expatriate footballers in Germany
Association football midfielders
PFC CSKA Moscow players
FC Asmaral Moscow players
FC Lokomotiv Moscow players
FC Torpedo Moscow players